The South African Railways Class MD 2-6-6-2 of 1910 was a steam locomotive from the pre-Union era in Transvaal.

In March 1910, the Central South African Railways commissioned a single experimental Mallet articulated compound steam locomotive with a  wheel arrangement. In 1912, when the locomotive was assimilated into the South African Railways, it was renumbered and designated .

Manufacturer
The first Mallet articulated compound steam locomotive on the Central South African Railways (CSAR) was ordered for test purposes from the American Locomotive Company in 1910. It was numbered 1001 and placed in service in March 1910.

Compound expansion
In a compound locomotive, steam is expanded in phases. After being expanded in a high-pressure cylinder and having then lost pressure and given up part of its heat, it is exhausted into a larger-volume low-pressure cylinder for secondary expansion, after which it is exhausted through the smokebox. By comparison, in the more usual arrangement of simple expansion (simplex), steam is expanded just once in any one cylinder before being exhausted through the smokebox.

In the compound Mallet locomotive, the rear set of coupled wheels are driven by the smaller high-pressure cylinders which are fed steam from the steam dome. Their spent steam is then fed to the larger low-pressure cylinders which drive the front set of coupled wheels.

Characteristics
The bar frames of the rear engine unit and its high-pressure cylinders were rigidly attached to the boiler with the engine's wide firebox extending over the coupled wheels. The front engine unit and its low-pressure cylinders were not rigidly attached to the boiler barrel, but carried the boiler on a single sliding bearing which was placed between the leading and intermediate coupled wheels. The underside of the smokebox was flattened to provide clearance between it and the cylinder assemblies of the front engine unit. The two engine units were coupled together by a single vertical pin connection, arranged at a point on the centre-line of the high-pressure cylinder saddle casting.

The locomotive used saturated steam. The high-pressure cylinders had piston valves arranged above the cylinders, while the low-pressure cylinders had Allen Richardson balanced slide valves, also arranged above the cylinders and all actuated by Walschaerts valve gear. Copper steam pipes were arranged on each side of the dome and passed vertically down outside the boiler to the steam chests of the high-pressure cylinders. The exhaust from the high-pressure cylinders passed through a receiver pipe along the centre of the engine to the low-pressure cylinders. The exhaust from the low-pressure cylinders passed to the smokebox and blast pipe through a pipe fitted with flexible connections.

The firebox had a short combustion chamber. The Walschaerts valve motion was operated by hand screw gear, with the reversing gear for one engine unit's set of gear arranged to be raised while the other's was lowered for forward or reverse, thereby balancing each other.

Performance
At low speed, the locomotive proved to be capable of handling heavier trains than any of the existing CSAR fleet of goods locomotives, but at higher speeds of  it could not compete successfully because of excessive wear on the moving parts which resulted in failures and as a consequence, high maintenance cost. Part of the problem arose from the fact that the Mallet was expected to run to the same train schedules as the non-articulated locomotive fleet in spite of the fact that its smaller coupled wheels made it more suited to heavy low-speed work. It has been surmised that, had it been superheated and equipped with larger diameter coupled wheels, the results may have been much better.

Service
The Mallet was acquired as an experiment, the ultimate object being to improve traffic flow on the  coal line between Witbank and Germiston. The increase of traffic and the resultant congestion on this line with a ruling gradient of 1 in 100 (1%) was causing considerable delays en route, which led to excessive hours of duty being imposed on crews.

South African Railways

When the Union of South Africa was established on 31 May 1910, the three Colonial government railways (Cape Government Railways, Natal Government Railways and CSAR) were united under a single administration to control and administer the railways, ports and harbours of the Union. Although the South African Railways and Harbours came into existence in 1910, the actual classification and renumbering of all the rolling stock of the three constituent railways were only implemented with effect from 1 January 1912.

In 1912, the engine was renumbered 1617 and designated the sole  locomotive on the SAR. It remained in service on the line between Witbank and Germiston until it was withdrawn from service and scrapped in 1926.

Illustration

References

2240
2240
2-6-6-2 locomotives
(1C)C1 locomotives
ALCO locomotives
Cape gauge railway locomotives
Railway locomotives introduced in 1910
1910 in South Africa
Scrapped locomotives